Lambrigg  is a civil parish in the South Lakeland District of Cumbria, England. It contains three listed buildings that are recorded in the National Heritage List for England.  All the listed buildings are designated at Grade II, the lowest of the three grades, which is applied to "buildings of national importance and special interest".  The parish is almost entirely rural, and the listed buildings consist of two houses and a railway viaduct.


Buildings

References

Citations

Sources

Lists of listed buildings in Cumbria